Vadakkepuzha Weir (Malayalam:വടക്കേപ്പുഴ തടയണ) is a diversion dam of Earthen type constructed across Vadakkepuzha which is a tributary of Muvattupuzha river in Arakkulam village in Idukki district of Kerala, India.  Vadakkepuzha weir is a part of an augmentation scheme for the Idukki Hydro Electric Project. Narakakkanam, Azhutha, Vazhikkadavu, Vadakkepuzha and Kuttiar diversion schemes were later added to Idukki HEP to augment the reservoir.   Water from the reservoir is pumped in to Idukki reservoir through a pump house with three pumps.

Specifications
Location	Latitude : 9⁰ 47′ 00 ” N	
Longitude: 76⁰ 51′ E	
Panchayath : Arakkulam	
Village : Arakkulam
District : Idukki
River Basin : Periyar
River: Vadakkepuzha
Release from Dam to river : Malankara reservoir
Taluk through which release flows : Thodupuzha
Year of completion : 2003
Name of Project: Idukki HEP
Purpose of Project	Hydro Power	

Type of Dam : Earthen- bund
Classification : Weir
Maximum Water Level (MWL) : EL 724.00 m
Full Reservoir Level ( FRL)  : EL 723.25 m
Storage at FRL ; 0.0667 Mm3
Height from deepest foundation : 2.80m ( Height from bed level)
Length	
Spillway : Ungated – Overflow section
Crest Level	NA
River Outlet	Not provided
Officers in charge & phone No.	Assistant Executive Engineer, Idukki Augmentation Scheme, Moolamattom. Phone-9496009429
Installed capacity of the Project ; 780 MW

References

Dams in Kerala
Dams completed in 2003